The Royal Monastery of Santa Isabel (Spanish: Real Monasterio de Santa Isabel) is a monastery located in Madrid, Spain. It was declared Bien de Interés Cultural in 1995.

References 

Buildings and structures in Embajadores neighborhood, Madrid
Bien de Interés Cultural landmarks in Madrid
Organisations based in Spain with royal patronage